Brent Robert Findlay (born 16 October 1985) is a New Zealand cricketer. He was born in Rangiora. He attended St. Andrew's College, Christchurch and played in the Under-19 Cricket World Cup in 2004 and plays for Canterbury in State Championship competition. He is currently playing in England during the English summer for Kimberley Institute Cricket Club who are based in Nottingham. Brent also spent much of the 2005 season with Kimberley.

References

1985 births
Living people
New Zealand cricketers
Canterbury cricketers
Cricketers from Rangiora